After the Balls Drop is a live album by the New York-based rock band Les Savy Fav.  It was recorded at the band's New Year's Eve show in the early morning hours of January 1, 2008, at New York City's Bowery Ballroom.

In addition to original material, the set included a number of cover songs by bands such as Pixies, Misfits, and Creedence Clearwater Revival. After the Balls Drop was released April 29, 2008, on Frenchkiss Records as a digital-only release.

Track listing
 Equestrian
 Patty Lee
 What Would Wolves Do?
 Sweat Descends
 Yawn Yawn Yawn
 We'll Make A Lover Of You
 The Year Before The Year 2000
 The Lowest Bitter
 Who Rocks The Party
 Tim Speech
 Hey Tonight (Creedence Clearwater Revival Cover)
 Debaser (Pixies Cover)
 Astro Zombies (Misfits Cover)
 Sliver (Nirvana Cover)
 Everybody's Gotta Live (Love Cover)

Personnel
 Tim Harrington – vocals
 Seth Jabour – guitar
 Andrew Reuland – guitar
 Syd Butler – bass
 Harrison Haynes – drums

References

External links
French Kiss Records

2008 albums
Les Savy Fav albums
Frenchkiss Records albums
Albums recorded at the Bowery Ballroom